Richard de Pearsall Pearson (1 August 1918 – 2 August 2011) was an English character actor who appeared in numerous film, television and stage productions over a period of 65 years. He played leading roles in several London West End plays and also supported Maggie Smith, Robert Morley and others in long-running West End stage productions. His many screen appearances included character parts in three Roman Polanski films.

Private life
Richard Pearson was born and brought up in Monmouth. He was educated at Aymestrey Court, Worcester, and at Monmouth School, where his father, Cyril Pearson (1888–1946), taught French.

Richard Pearson's early stage career was interrupted by military service in the Second World War with the 52nd (Lowland) Infantry Division. He was mentioned in dispatches and left the army with the rank of lieutenant-colonel.

He married the actress Patricia Dickson (1927–2014) in 1949. They lived until the late 1950s in Nassau Street, in the Fitzrovia district of London, then in Beckenham, and latterly in Richmond upon Thames. They had two sons, Simon and Patrick; Patrick is also an actor.

In the later years of his life, Pearson suffered from myocardial degeneration. He died on 2 August 2011, the morning after his 93rd birthday.

Film and television
"Notable films of his career included Brian Desmond Hurst's Scrooge (1951) as well as a brief appearance in John Schlesinger's Sunday Bloody Sunday (1971) and cameo roles in three films by Roman Polanski: Macbeth (1971), Tess (1979) and Pirates (1986). Pearson did not make his film début until the age of 32, when he played a sergeant in the motion picture The Girl is Mine (1950). This was followed a year later by his performance as Mr Tupper in Scrooge.

In later years, Pearson is perhaps best known for his role as Mole in Cosgrove Hall's The Wind in the Willows (1983), its subsequent television series, which led on from the original film, and its spin-off programme Oh, Mr. Toad, in all of which he starred alongside David Jason, Peter Sallis and Michael Hordern. He also appeared in episodes of "A Fine Romance", in "One Foot in the Grave" as Victor Meldrew's absent-minded brother, Alfred, in the "Men Behaving Badly" episode "Three Girlfriends", as Gary's father Mr Strang, and as Harry King in "My Good Friend", alongside George Cole and Minnie Driver. He played Mr. Pye in the 1985 TV movie Marple: The Moving Finger.

Selected filmography

Stage
"Pearson was the kind of actor on which the British theatre has always relied: utterly dependable and totally distinctive. His particular forte, with his slightly fluting voice, was for revealing the chink in the armour of middle-class respectability." He made his stage debut at the age of 18 at London's Collins's Music Hall. Though well known as a character actor, his leading roles in London theatres included Stanley in Harold Pinter's The Birthday Party (Lyric, Hammersmith, 1958), Charles Sidley in Peter Shaffer's The Public Eye (Globe, 1962), Harry in Charles Dyer's Staircase (Arts, Cambridge, 1969), and Mr Hardcastle in Oliver Goldsmith's She Stoops to Conquer (Young Vic, 1972).

With The Birthday Party, after a short, successful provincial tour, "the play was critically slaughtered when it opened at the Lyric Hammersmith in London in May 1958." Critics were baffled "and it was withdrawn after only a few performances – only one critic" (Harold Hobson) "had given it an unqualified welcome. But Pearson's portrait of the lodger fixed itself longest in the critical memory for its study of unexplained but deeply felt terror."

Among those he played beside on stage were Margaret Rutherford, Robert Morley, Maggie Smith, Kenneth Williams, Eileen Atkins and Margaret Tyzack.

Selected London appearances

References

External links

Obituary in The Independent

1918 births
2011 deaths
People from Monmouth, Wales
20th-century English male actors
English male film actors
English male television actors
English male stage actors
British Army personnel of World War II